SNT Dynamics is a South Korean weapons, windpower, auto parts and casting and machine tools manufacturer founded in 1959. Its heavy weapons equip most frontline units of the Republic of Korea Armed Forces. The company was designated as a defense contractor by the government in April 1973.

History 
SNT Dynamics was established in April 1959 under the name Yehwa Shotgun. In 1995 it changed its company name to Tongil Heavy Industries Co. Ltd. and in 2005 it changed its name to S&T Dynamics Co. Ltd. In 2006 it completed the acquisition of Daewoo Precision Industries, now SNT Motiv. In 26 February 2021, the company name was changed from S&T Dynamics to SNT Dynamics. In 28 February 2023 the company changes its korean domain.

Product

Own designs 
Nobong 40 mm twin naval cannon developed in 1996 to replace the OTO Melara DARDO CIWS of the South Korean Navy
KKCB 30 mm cannon produced since 2001, in use on the K30 Biho self-propelled anti-aircraft weapon
K40 40 mm cannon produced since 2008, in use on the K21 IFV
XK13 25 mm Korean OCSW. Cancelled in 2013.
KM138 automatic land mine dispenser
K18 smoke grenade launcher, in use on the M48 Patton South Korean variant model
KM250 smoke grenade launcher, in use on the K1 Main battle tank
KM255 smoke grenade launcher, in use on the K2 Black Panther
KM259 smoke grenade launcher, in use on the M9 Armored Combat Earthmover South Korean variant model
KM260 smoke grenade launcher, in use on the K200 infantry fighting vehicle
Soft-kill launcher system (SLS), in use on the K2 Black Panther
Remote Controlled Weapon Station (RCWS)
KM120 120 mm self-propelled mortar
EST15K transmission (6 forward, 3 reverse gears), will be integrated in the Altay MBT

Licensed production 
M2 Browning machine gun as the K6 HMG with a modification for a quick-change barrel
M61 Vulcan 20 mm rotary cannon as the KM168 produced since 1977
M39 cannon 20 mm cannon as the M39A3, in use on the KF-5E
Bofors 40 mm cannon as the 40L/70K produced since 1995
X200-5K transmission, in use on the K200 APC and M113 APC
HMPT500-3EK transmission, in use on the K-SAM Pegasus and K30 Biho
HMPT500-4EK transmission, in use on the K21 infantry fighting vehicle
XTG411-2A transmission, in use on the K55 SPH and K77 fire direction center vehicle (FDCV)
XTG411-4A transmission, in use on the MX992 and Stingray M578
X1100-5A3 transmission, in use on the K9 Thunder, K10 ARV, T-155 Fırtına and AHS Krab
DAGAIE NG anti-guided weapons decoy system

References

External links 
 SNT Dynamics Homepage
 Bloomberg Businessweek stock profile

Firearm manufacturers of South Korea
Manufacturing companies of South Korea
Defence companies of South Korea
Companies based in Changwon
Manufacturing companies established in 1959
South Korean brands
South Korean companies established in 1959